We've Got Your Number was a BBC National Lottery game show broadcast on BBC One from 27 February to 22 May 1999. It was hosted by Brian Conley.

Ratings

References

External links

1999 British television series debuts
1999 British television series endings
1990s British game shows
BBC television game shows
British game shows about lotteries
Television series by Banijay